This is a list of SIU Edwardsville Cougars men's basketball head coaches.

References

SIU Edwardsville

SIU Edwardsville Cougars basketball, men's, coaches